Alfredo del Águila Estrella (3 January 1935 – 26 July 2018) was a Mexican football forward who played for Mexico in the 1962 FIFA World Cup. He also played for Deportivo Toluca and Club de Futbol America.

References

External links

1935 births
2018 deaths
Mexican footballers
Mexico international footballers
Association football forwards
Deportivo Toluca F.C. players
1962 FIFA World Cup players